Auratonota spinivalva is a species of moth of the family Tortricidae. It is found in Mexico.

The wingspan is about 19 mm. The ground colour of the forewings is cream, suffused with brown except for the edges of the markings. These markings are dark brown, but paler and more ochreous in the dorsal half of the median cell. The hindwings are brownish, but paler basally.

References

Moths described in 2000
Auratonota
Moths of Central America